Copper Creek is an unincorporated community located in Russell County, Virginia.

Notable residents
Country music legend Sara Carter of the Carter Family was born there.
Appalachian music man Uncle Charlie Osborne lived there.

Unincorporated communities in Russell County, Virginia
Unincorporated communities in Virginia